The 2019 LPGA of Japan Tour was the 52nd season of the LPGA of Japan Tour, the professional golf tour for women operated by the Ladies Professional Golfers' Association of Japan. The 2019 schedule included 39 official events all played in Japan.

Leading money winner was Ai Suzuki with 160,189,665 ¥ while Hinako Shibuno won the tour's Mercedes Ranking. Jiyai Shin finished most often (18 times) inside the top ten.

Schedule
The number in parentheses after winners' names show the player's total number wins in official money individual events on the LPGA of Japan Tour, including that event. All tournaments are played in Japan.

Events in bold were majors.
The Toto Japan Classic was co-sanctioned with the LPGA Tour.

References

External links
 

2019
2019 in women's golf
2019 in Japanese sport